Emergency Tsunami is the second commercial mixtape by Canadian rapper Nav. It was released through XO and Republic Records on November 6, 2020. The mixtape contains guest appearances from Gunna, Young Thug, Lil Baby, Lil Keed, and SahBabii. It was produced by American record producer Wheezy, with help from other producers. The mixtape was Nav's third project of the year, following his third studio album, Good Intentions, and its deluxe reissue, Brown Boy 2. The bonus version of the mixtape, including two additional songs, was released five days later, on November 11, 2020. It features an additional guest appearance from Future. It was Wheezy's second time producing every song of a project, following Gunna's extended play, Drip or Drown, in 2017. The cover of the mixtape says "emergency tsunami" in red letters in Japanese. The mixtape was supported by one single, "Young Wheezy", with Gunna, which was sent to US rhythmic contemporary radio, on January 12, 2021.

Commercial performance
Emergency Tsunami debuted at number six on the US Billboard 200 chart, earning 42,000 album-equivalent units with 7,000 in pure album sales in its first week. In its second week, the mixtape dropped to number 43 on the chart

Track listing
Credits adapted from Tidal.

 
Notes
 "Breaking News Intro" and "Breaking News Outro" feature uncredited vocals from David C. Page.
 "Young Wheezy" features additional vocals from Travis Scott.

Charts

Weekly charts

Year-end charts

References

 

2020 mixtape albums
Nav (rapper) albums
Republic Records albums
Albums produced by Wheezy